The Belgian Labour Party (BWP; , POB) was the first major socialist party in Belgium. Founded in 1885, the party was officially disbanded in 1940 and superseded by the Belgian Socialist Party in 1945.

History

In April 1885, a meeting of 112 workers took place in a room of the café De Zwaan on the Grand-Place in Brussels, at the same place where the First International had convened, and where Karl Marx had written The Communist Manifesto. At this meeting the Belgian Labour Party (POB or BWP) was created. Several groups had been represented at this meeting, including the BSP of Edward Anseele. The members were mainly craftsmen and not workers from industrial centres (with the exception of Ghent). When drafting a programme for the new party, it was feared that a radical programme would deter workers. On that basis it was decided that the word socialism would not be mentioned in the name of the party, a point of view which was also defended by Cesar De Paepe (1841–1890).

The Charter of Quaregnon  (located in this municipality and not in Mons because of the Garde Civique's 'fusillade of Mons'), of 1894 provided the doctrinal basis for the Belgian socialists from 1894 until 1979. Before 1919, the district system in Belgian elections made it almost impossible for the Labour Party to get parliamentary seats in Flanders, and the Ghent socialist leader, Edward Anseele, was elected in Liège. After 1919, universal male suffrage and proportional representation greatly enhanced the party's parliamentary strength and it participated in several governments.

In the 1919 election, the Belgian Labour Party won 36.6% of the vote and increased their parliamentary representation from 26 to 70 seats. This was enough to deny the Catholic Party the majority it had enjoyed since 1884, which led the Catholic Party to form a coalition with Labour, forming a cabinet that contained Labour members. The Belgian Labour Party used this opportunity to demand and to have passed reforms such as the repeal of a law that prohibited picketing, an eight-hour workday, old-age pensions, inheritance taxes, and a graduated income tax.

The party was a member of the Labour and Socialist International between 1923 and 1940.

After World War II, most of the BWP/POB officials joined to found the Belgian Socialist Party.

Election results 

 This election saw the introduction of Proportional representation (PR), making Belgium the first country in Europe to adopt said voting system.

Notable members
 Victor Serge, member of the youth section of the Belgian Workers' Party.
 Edward Anseele
 Camille Huysmans
 Henri de Man
 Jules Destrée
 Paul-Henri Spaak, one of the Founding fathers of the European Union.
 Emile Vandervelde
 August Vermeylen

See also
 Politics of Belgium
 Progressive Party (Belgium)
 Christene Volkspartij

References

Further reading

Defunct socialist parties in Belgium
Second International
Members of the Labour and Socialist International
Political parties established in 1885
1885 establishments in Belgium
Labour parties
1940 disestablishments in Belgium
Political parties disestablished in 1940

fr:Parti socialiste belge#1885-1940 : le Parti ouvrier belge